Ravenden is a town in Lawrence County, Arkansas, United States. The population was 470 at the 2010 census. The town is in the valley of the Spring River along U.S. Highway 63 and the Burlington-Northern Railroad.

History
The community building, still in use, was dedicated in 1960. Ray Ellis was mayor at that time. The Frisco Railroad was bought out by, and merged with, the Burlington-Northern Railroad in 1980.

Geography
Ravenden is located in the northwest corner of Lawrence County at  (36.233972, -91.251911). U.S. Highways 62, 63, and 412 run concurrently through the north side of the town, leading northwest  to Hardy and southeast  to Imboden. Arkansas Highway 90 leads north from Ravenden  to Ravenden Springs.

The Spring River, a southeast-flowing tributary of the Black River, flows through the southern part of the town.

Demographics

As of the census of 2000, there were 511 people, 209 households, and 145 families residing in the town. The racial makeup of the town was 97.26% White, 1.76% Native American, 0.59% from other races, and 0.39% from two or more races.  1.37% of the population were Hispanic or Latino of any race.

There were 209 households, out of which 34.9% had children under the age of 18 living with them, 53.6% were married couples living together, 12.9% had a female householder with no husband present, and 30.6% were non-families. 26.8% of all households were made up of individuals, and 9.6% had someone living alone who was 65 years of age or older.  The average household size was 2.44 and the average family size was 2.97.

In the town, the population was spread out, with 27.6% under the age of 18, 8.8% from 18 to 24, 24.9% from 25 to 44, 23.1% from 45 to 64, and 15.7% who were 65 years of age or older.  The median age was 37 years. For every 100 females, there were 97.3 males.  For every 100 females age 18 and over, there were 93.7 males.

The median income for a household in the town was $25,625, and the median income for a family was $29,896. Males had a median income of $23,281 versus $14,444 for females. The per capita income for the town was $10,723.  About 19.5% of families and 28.4% of the population were below the poverty line, including 48.6% of those under age 18 and 15.1% of those age 65 or over.

Education
Residents are zoned to the Sloan-Hendrix School District which operates Sloan-Hendrix High School.

References

Towns in Lawrence County, Arkansas
Towns in Arkansas